This is the list of äkıms of West Kazakhstan Region that have held the position since 1992.

List of Äkıms 

 Näjımeden Esqaliev (7 February 1992 – 18 January 1993)
 Qabibolla Jaqypov (19 January 1993 – 18 December 2000)
 Qyrymbek Köşerbaev (18 December 2000 – 18 November 2003)
 Nūrğali Äşım (18 November 2003 – 28 August 2007)
 Baqtyqoja Izmūhambetov (28 August 2007 – 18 January 2012)
 Nūrlan Noğaev (20 January 2012 – 26 March 2016)
 Altai Kölgınov (26 March 2016 – 13 June 2019)
 Ğali Esqaliev (13 June 2019 – present)

References 

Government of Kazakhstan